SNCC may refer to:

 Ernulf Academy, formerly known as St Neots Community College (SNCC), an educational establishment in England
 Société nationale des Chemins de fer du Congo, national railway company in Congo
 Student Nonviolent Coordinating Committee, a human rights group in the United States